Arawan can refer to:

Araouane, a city in Mali
Arauan languages, spoken in Brazil
USS Arawan II (SP-1), a United States Navy patrol vessel in commission from 1917 to 1918